Sanafir Island is a Saudi island in the Straits of Tiran east of Tiran Island. It is about 
it is located at the entrance to the Straits of Tiran, which separates the Gulf of Aqaba from the Red Sea. The island is about 2.5 km from Tiran Island. The island are characterized by floating coral reefs.

The island was under Egyptian control in the past but now it is returned back under Saudi Arabia sovereignty since the 8 April 2016, after the completion of transfer procedures. On 17 June 2017, Egyptian President Abdel Fattah el-Sisi ratified the maritime demarcation agreement between the two countries. It was adopted on maps and official documents on 17 August 2017 and approved by the Egyptian House of Representatives on 14 June 2017, which approved the transfer of the island and its neighbor to Saudi Arabia. The United Nations was notified in accordance with the Charter of Article 102 of the provisions of subsidiarity and sovereignty relating to islands and maritime territory.

Etymology 
The name comes from Coptic ⲥⲉⲛⲛⲟⲩϥⲣⲓ Sanufri which itself comes from Egyptian s.t-n-nfr.t, "place of good profit".

Transfer to Saudi Arabia
On 9 April 2016, the Egyptian government declared that Sanafir and Tiran Island fall within the territorial waters of Saudi Arabia, as codified in the maritime border agreement signed with the government of Saudi Arabia on the previous day. However, the agreement had to be ratified by the Parliament of Egypt.

The proposed deal was  quashed by an Egyptian judge, and an Egyptian court gave its final ruling in January 2017, rejecting the deal and affirming Egyptian sovereignty on both the islands, supported by much of the Egyptian public. The proposed deal caused turmoil in Egyptian politics and across the country, erupting mass protests that accused President Sisi of "selling" Egyptian land.

On 14 June 2017, Egypt's House Committee on Defence and National Security unanimously approved the transfer of Tiran and Sanafir islands to Saudi Arabia, and the plan was passed by the Egyptian Parliament later the same day. The deal moves forward the idea of building the Saudi–Egypt Causeway.

History
In World War II, the Egyptian forces on Tiran and Sanafir islands were part of the Egyptian troops protecting Suez canal, according to Egypt's representative at the 659th UN security council meeting on 15 February 1954:

In the same meeting, Egypt's representative considered Tiran and Sanafir islands an integral part of the territory of Egypt, since they have been under Egypt's administration since 1906:

See also
 Tiran Island
 Straits of Tiran

References

Islands of the Red Sea
Uninhabited islands of Saudi Arabia